This page shows results of Canadian federal elections in Edmonton and the surrounding area.

Regional profile
Edmonton is far friendlier to centre-left parties than the rest of Alberta. It is the current base of the provincial NDP. The NDP scored an upset victory in the 2015 provincial election in part by taking all of Edmonton, and held all but one Edmonton seat even as it lost its majority dominance in the Legislature in 2019.

However, Edmonton has been historically more conservative than most other large cities in Canada. Since 1958, Conservatives have won more of the seats here than any other party, although in most cases with smaller pluralities than the astronomical margins in rural Alberta. Social Credit, at first a radical movement but by the 1940s morphing into a conservative-style party, took several seats between 1935 and 1958. From 1972 to 1988, Conservatives won every Edmonton seat, although occasionally with less than half the votes in the district. (A Conservative won the Edmonton Strathcona seat four times with less than half of the votes during that period - in 1962 with just a bit more than a third of the votes.)

From 1935 to 2008, the CCF/NDP won only one seat in Edmonton (the only one in all of Alberta), despite taking as much as 18 percent of the province-wide federal vote. The NDP won an Alberta seat in 1988 when Ross Harvey won Edmonton East.

Edmonton is the only part of Alberta where the federal Liberals have consistently broken through in recent times (since 1993). It held two to four seats here from 1993 to 2006, although never winning by large margins. The Liberals lost all their Edmonton seats in 2006, but won more in 2015 before losing them again in 2021. The four seats the Liberals won in 1993 were the first they had won anywhere in Alberta since 1968.

In 2006, the Conservatives again achieved a total sweep of Alberta, repeating their 1958-1988 shut-outs, but this was broken by the New Democratic Party in Edmonton-Strathcona in 2008. The NDP has held this seat every election since, including the 2011. In 2011, the NDP finished second in all the other Edmonton-area ridings except Edmonton-Sherwood Park (where it came in third behind the Conservative winner and an independent candidate).

The safest Tory seats are located in the more suburban ridings outside of the city core. From 2004 to 2011, their best riding in the region was Edmonton—Spruce Grove, most of which is now Edmonton West. In 2011, for instance, the Conservatives won 71% of the vote there. They also won more than 60% of the vote in Edmonton—St. Albert, Edmonton—Leduc and Edmonton—Mill Woods—Beaumont.

Liberals, on the other hand, have recently had most of their success in the downtown ridings, not in the suburbs. Liberals won seats in 2015 and 2019. One of the Liberal victories in 2015 was in Edmonton Centre.

The NDP, both provincially and federally, has had proven popularity in the university-oriented and culturally-diverse area of Old Strathcona, and recently has come in second or better in almost all the ridings in the Edmonton area.

In 2015, the Liberals took two ridings, the NDP retained Edmonton Strathcona, and the Tories held the remainder. In 2019, Conservatives took all the Edmonton ridings except Edmonton Strathcona, which remained in NDP hands as the only non-Tory riding in Alberta. The Conservatives' dominance in the Edmonton representation was achieved despite Conservative candidates taking a combined 55 percent of the city vote. The near-total NDP shut-out was achieved despite the NDP taking 20 percent of the city vote. Such was repeated in 2021.

2015 - 42nd General Election

2011 - 41st General Election

2008 - 40th General Election

2006 - 39th General Election

2004 - 38th General Election

2000 - 37th General Election

References

Alberta federal electoral districts
Politics of Edmonton
Edmonton
History of Edmonton